The 1912–13 Kansas Jayhawks men's basketball team represented the University of Kansas during the 1912–13 college men's basketball season, which was their 15th season. They were coached by W. O. Hamilton who was in his 4th year as head coach. They played their home games at Robinson Gymnasium and were members of the MVIAA. The Jayhawks finished the season 16–6.

Roster
Walter Boehm
Loren Brown
Ray Dunmire
Charles Greenless
Ora Hite
Ralph Sproull
Arthur Weaver

Schedule and results
The schedule below is missing five games. The Jayhawks went 3–2 in the missing games.

References

Kansas
Kansas Jayhawks men's basketball seasons
Kansas Jayhawks Men's Basketball Team
Kansas Jayhawks Men's Basketball Team